The Socialist Party of Canada (SPC) is a socialist political party in Canada, affiliated with the World Socialist Movement.

It was founded in June 1931 in Winnipeg, Manitoba by British Columbian politician Phyllis Corriveau.

The party adopted the policies of the Socialist Party of Great Britain (SPGB) which rejected Leninism, social democracy and trade unionism in favour of a belief in "revolutionary Marxism and democratic revolution".

History 

As the fractured groups of the left coalesced to form the Co-operative Commonwealth Federation (CCF), the SPC did not make great headway. The Winnipeg-based Socialist Party of Canada remained outside of the CCF (and its successor, the New Democratic Party), rejecting its evolutionary socialist approach as being "reformist". The Socialist Party of Canada (British Columbia), which was founded in 1932 by Ernest Winch independently of the Socialist Party of Canada founded in Winnipeg, joined and eventually merged with the CCF to form the British Columbia CCF, the Socialist Party of Canada remained independent of the broader socialist movement and spread its message by holding town hall meetings, open air rallies and distributing literature at farmers markets and street corners.

In October 1933, the party launched the New Western Socialist Journal to help bring publicity to the party. The first two issues criticized the CCF and the Communist Party of Canada for allegedly compromising with capitalism. The SPC never found a reason to change its attitude towards the two parties.

World War II 
During World War II, the SPC campaigned against the war, stating that working class blood should not be shed. During the war, the Communist Party was outlawed, but the SPC continued to hold anti-war demonstrations and rallies. The party was investigated by the Government of Canada, but was never taken as a serious threat: 

The party continued to publish socialist manifesto leaflets through the years. When funds permitted, it ran candidates in elections. In the late 1970s, the head office was moved from Winnipeg to Victoria, British Columbia. The membership of the Socialist Party continued to decline and the party admits that it never managed to live up to the "success and glamour" of the old party. The party has not wavered from the original policies that it adopted seventy years ago.

Election results by year

General elections

By-election, 29 May 1961

Present activity 
The party promotes a post-capitalist socialist society. It seeks to achieve this by distributing socialist material around the world and raising class consciousness. The party believes that socialism must be implemented everywhere at the same time in order to work.

The bulk of current party members are in British Columbia and Ontario. It publishes a journal titled Imagine and distributes the literature of the SPGB.

The party is a member of the World Socialist Movement along with its "companion parties", the SPGB, the World Socialist Party (New Zealand) and the World Socialist Party of the United States.

Publications 
 
 The Meaning of Social Revolution (1945)
 The Russian Revolution: Its Origins and Outcome (1948)
 The World of Abundance (1973)
 Economics Exposed (1984)

See also 
 Socialist Party of North America (1911)
 World Socialist Party of Canada (1960s)

References

External links 
 Socialist Party of Canada home page.
Socialist Fulcrum archive
 Socialist Party of Canada Forum.
 Socialist Party of Canada Constitution.
 History of the Socialist Party of Canada. J. M. Milne (1973).
 The Impossibilists. A short history with selections from the press of the Socialist Party of Canada and the One Big Union (1906–1938).

Federal political parties in Canada
Socialist parties in Canada
Socialist Party of Canada breakaway groups
Companion Parties of the World Socialist Movement
Political parties established in 1931